Anton Muheim (13 June 1916 – 11 May 2016) was a Swiss Social Democratic politician.

Personal life
Muheim was born and raised in Lucerne, the son of an inspector at the Lake Lucerne Navigation Company. He studied law and economics, leading his own law practice and receiving a doctorate in economics.

Politics
He served on the Cantonal Council of Lucerne from 1959 until 1978. He served concurrently on the National Council from 1963 until 1983, serving as its President in 1973 and 1974.

References

1916 births
2016 deaths
Members of the National Council (Switzerland)
Presidents of the National Council (Switzerland)
Social Democratic Party of Switzerland politicians